C. T. Goonawardana was the 29th Surveyor General of Sri Lanka. He was appointed in 1968, succeeding P. U. Ratnatunga, and held the office until 1970. He was succeeded by C. Vanniasingam.

References

G